Josef von Báky (23 March 1902, Zombor, Austria-Hungary – 28 July 1966, Munich, Germany) was a Hungarian filmmaker. He was also known as Josef v. Baky and József Baky.  He was born in the village of Zobor in the Kingdom of Hungary (today Zombor, Slovakia). He worked as an assistant to Géza von Bolváry.

He worked as director or producer on no less than 48 films.  He died in Munich, Bavaria, Germany.

Báky's best known film is Münchhausen, which was released in 1943. It is a fantasy-comedy and is noted for how it avoids politics of its time. The film was ordered by Nazi propaganda minister Goebbels to celebrate the 25th anniversary of UFA and to compete with Hollywood productions.

Selected filmography
  (1936)
 The Great and the Little Love (1938)
 The Woman at the Crossroads (1938)
  (German-language version, 1939)
 A varieté csillagai (Hungarian-language version, 1939)
 Her First Experience (1939)
  (1940)
  (1941)
 Münchhausen (1943)
 Via Mala (1945)
 And the Heavens Above Us (1947)
 The Last Illusion (1949)
  (1949)
 Two Times Lotte (1950)
 Dreaming Lips (1953)
 Diary of a Married Woman (1953)
  (co-director: Erich Engel, 1955)
 Hotel Adlon (1955)
 Dunja (1955)
  (1956)
 The Girl and the Legend (1957)
 Precocious Youth (1957)
 Confess, Doctor Corda (1958)
 Stefanie (1958)
 The Man Who Sold Himself (1959)
 The Ideal Woman (1959)
 Marili (1959)
 Storm in a Water Glass (1960)
 The Strange Countess (1961)

References

External links

1902 births
1966 deaths
People from Sombor
Hungarians in Vojvodina
Hungarian film directors
Film people from Bavaria
Best Director German Film Award winners